An asana is a body posture, used in both medieval hatha yoga and modern yoga. The term is derived from the Sanskrit word for 'seat'. While many of the oldest mentioned asanas are indeed seated postures for meditation, asanas may be standing, seated, arm-balances, twists, inversions, forward bends, backbends, or reclining in prone or supine positions. The asanas have been given a variety of English names by competing schools of yoga.

The traditional number of asanas is the symbolic 84, but different texts identify different selections, sometimes listing their names without describing them. Some names have been given to different asanas over the centuries, and some asanas have been known by a variety of names, making tracing and the assignment of dates difficult. For example, the name Muktasana is now given to a variant of Siddhasana with one foot in front of the other, but has also been used for Siddhasana and other cross-legged meditation poses. As another example, the headstand is now known by the 20th century name Shirshasana, but an older name for the pose is Kapalasana. Sometimes, the names have the same meaning, as with Bidalasana and Marjariasana, both meaning Cat Pose.

Affixes
Variations on the basic asanas are indicated by Sanskrit affixes including the following:

Asanas 

A single asana is listed for each main pose, whether or not there are variations. Thus for Sirsasana (Yoga headstand), only one pose is illustrated, although the pose can be varied by moving the legs apart sideways or front-and-back, by lowering one leg to the floor, by folding the legs into lotus posture, by turning the hips to one side, by placing the hands differently on the ground, and so on. Iyengar's 1966 Light on Yoga lists 15 variations on the basic headstand, including for instance the combined variation Parivrttaikapada Sirsasana in which not only are the hips revolved but the legs are apart front-and-back. Since then, variations of many other poses have been created; their names are not listed here. Yin Yoga names are for the equivalent Yin variants; these are usually somewhat different from the conventional (Yang) poses.

Indian texts are "notoriously difficult to date". The table shows the approximate date and abbreviated title of the earliest document or authority to describe that asana (not only naming it), as follows:

 AS  = Ahirbudhnya Saṃhitā, c. 7th century
 BaH = Bahr al-Hayāt, 17th century
 DU  = Darśana Upaniṣad, c. 4th century
 GhS = Gheraṇḍa Saṃhitā, 17th century
 GS  = Gorakṣaśataka, 10th century
 HAP = Hațhābhyāsapaddhati, 18th century
 HR  = Haṭha Ratnāvali, 17th century
 HY  = Hemacandra's Yogaśāstra, 11th century
 HYP = Haṭha Yoga Pradīpikā, 15th century
 JP  = Joga Pradīpikā, 18th century
 LoY = Light on Yoga, 1966
 PL  = Post-Light on Yoga
 PSV = Pātañjalayogaśāstravivaraṇa, 8th century
 ShS = Śiva Saṃhitā, 14th century
 ST  = Śrītattvanidhi, 19th century
 TB  = Theos Bernard, 1950
 TK  = Tirumalai Krishnamacharya, c. 1940
 V   = Vimānārcanākalpa, 10th century
 VM  = Vivekamārtaṇḍa, 13th century
 VS  = Vāsiṣṭha Saṁhitā, 13th century

See also

 Mudra – yoga gestures
 Pranayama – yoga breathing techniques
 Surya Namaskar – a foundational sequence of asanas

Notes

References

Sources

External links

 Beyogi Library of Yoga Poses
 Jack Cuneo Light on Yoga Project

Asanas
Yoga as exercise